Bilimora high-speed railway station is a under construction railway station on the Mumbai–Ahmedabad high-speed rail corridor. It is located at Kesali village near Bilimora, Gujarat, India. The railway station is scheduled to be completed by December 2024. The Bilimora station will be operational by 2026 along with the country's first high-speed railway.

Lines 
Bilimora high-speed railway station will be served by the Mumbai–Ahmedabad high-speed rail corridor, and is located 217.300 km from the official starting point of the Mumbai–Ahmedabad high-speed rail corridor in Mumbai.

Station layout 
The Bilimora High-Speed Railway station will have two elevated opposite platforms, With the under constructed station building will be located underneath. The Railway station will have two side platforms, serving 2 tracks for regular service.

References

High-speed railway stations in Gujarat